A total solar eclipse will occur on January 27, 2093. A solar eclipse occurs when the Moon passes between Earth and the Sun, thereby totally or partly obscuring the image of the Sun for a viewer on Earth. A total solar eclipse occurs when the Moon's apparent diameter is larger than the Sun's, blocking all direct sunlight, turning day into darkness. Totality occurs in a narrow path across Earth's surface, with the partial solar eclipse visible over a surrounding region thousands of kilometres wide.

Related eclipses

Solar eclipses 2091–2094

Saros series 142

Inex series

References

External links 

2093 01 27
2093 in science
2093 01 27
2093 01 27